Vicente Ramón Hernández Peña (19 July 1935 – 25 March 2018) was a Roman Catholic bishop.

Hernández Peña was ordained to the priesthood in 1960. From 1974 to 1982, he served as titular bishop of Sullectum and auxiliary bishop of the Roman Catholic Archdiocese of Caracas, Venezuela. Hernández Peña then served as coadjutor bishop of the Roman Catholic Diocese of Trujillo, Venezuela and as bishop of the diocese from 1982 to 2012.

Notes

1935 births
2018 deaths
Venezuelan Roman Catholic bishops
Roman Catholic bishops of Trujillo, Venezuela